The Lao Front for National Development (LFND;) is a Laotian popular front founded in 1979, and led by the Lao People's Revolutionary Party. Its task is to organize Laotian mass mobilization, and other socio-political, organizations. In 1988, its tasks were expanded to include certain ethnic minority affairs. It is also in charge of religious affairs; all religious organizations within Laos must register with the LFND.

Presidents

Formerly Front organisations
 Neo Lao Issara (Free Lao Front) (1950–1956), chairman: Souphanouvong
 Neo Lao Hak Sat (Lao Patriotic Front) (1956–1979), chairman: Souphanouvong

Electoral history

National Assembly elections

References 

Popular fronts of communist states
Lao People's Revolutionary Party
Political parties established in 1979
1979 establishments in Laos